Robert W. Norris (born May 22, 1932) was a major general in the United States Air Force. He was the United States Air Force Judge Advocate General from 1985 to 1988.  He holds a law degree from the University of Alabama Law School and The George Washington University Law School.

References

United States Air Force generals
1932 births
Living people